Haidakhan Babaji, simply called Babaji by his students and devotees, was a religious teacher who appeared near the village of Haidakhan in northern India (Uttarakhand) and taught publicly from 1970 until his death in 1984. He has a following in the Western world, and two ashrams in India.

Life 

According to "The Teachings of Babaji", Haidakhan Babaji "appeared" in June 1970 in a cave at the foot of the Kumaon Mount Kailash, across the River Ganges, near a remote village called Hairakhan, in the Nainital District of Uttrakhand, India. His followers maintain that Haidakhan Babaji is a Mahavatar – "a human manifestation of God, not born from woman."

It is reported that starting in late September 1970 Haidakhan Babaji spent forty-five days meditating in a small temple on the top of the Kumaon Mount Kailash "without leaving his seat." In September 1971, Haidakhan Babaji, in a sworn testimony, convinced the judge of the court in Haldwani that he was the "Old Hariakhan Baba", thought to be active in that region in the years 1860–1922, and that he had the right to use the ashrams in Kathgaria and Haidakhan. In 1971 Haidakhan Babaji started travelling across India, proclaiming his message, performing sacred ceremonies, such as yagna, and attracting more devotees. This included celebrities, such as Shammi Kapoor, and gradually more Westerners.

Though some of his followers believed he was immortal, Haidakhan Babaji died on 14 February 1984; local sources said it appeared to be of heart failure. He was buried in Haidakhan Ashram.  This is how Babaji foretold and explained his death:

Teachings 

Haidakhan Babaji maintained that: "All religions are incorporated in the principle of Truth, Simplicity and Love". In his living years he taught intensively the importance to live a simple life with loving principles in truth. Although worshipped according to local customs, Haidakhan Babaji explained that he came to restore Sanatana Dharma (Hinduism).  Sanatan Dharma can be understood as a primordial religion reflecting natural laws established at the beginning of the Creation. He explained further: "I have come to guide humanity to a higher path. I do not belong to any particular religion, but respect all religions. I seek the elevation of all mankind. "

He stressed the unity of all religions as expressed in the following words: "In any town there is always a central place; all the roads in the town or from out of town lead to that central place. Similarly, all religions lead to one point, and that is God Himself; and therefore following any religion you will ultimately reach God." He said:  "We are all one with each other and with God." Haidakhan Babaji said: "You should seek harmony in everything you do. I am harmony. Thank you for your love." Haidakhan Babaji proclaimed: "One can follow any religion, one can follow any practice or path, but one must be humane." He said: "The world now is in a state of turmoil. It is suffering from three kinds of pain – physical, mental, spiritual – and there is only one way of being cured from these. We have to root out inhumanity and replace it with humanity. (…)" He also made the following statement: "The only true man is one who practices 'humanism.' (…) this is the only way to success in life."

Babaji talked about the importance of hard work and proper performance of one's duty so often that Karma Yoga should be considered the central element of his teachings.  Babaji used to say that: "Work is worship" and that hard work is the best spiritual practice.  On another occasion he said: "If you are engaged in doing good deeds and go on doing good acts, you will have good sleep, good appetite and bad thoughts will not cross your mind. Otherwise, you will always be criticizing others. In inaction, your minds will always be engaged in thinking critically of others. Karma – activity – is the only thing which can drive out all evils". Babaji also taught that "perfection in work" was the real meaning of Kriya Yoga.

Nama Japa, the repetition of God's name, was a fundamental part of Haidakhan Babaji's teachings. He explained that God's name is the most powerful sound of the Creation – "more powerful than a thousand atomic and hydrogen bombs."  – and that this is the only real thing. Haidakhan Babaji especially recommended the use of the mantra "Oṃ namaḥ śivāy" (Sanskrit: ॐ नमः शिवाय् ) – because of its protective qualities, but also stated that one can use any God's name "his religion teaches". The mantra is always written internationally simplified as "Om Namah Shivay" in books about Babaji written in English or other languages.

Haidakhan Babaji warned his followers about the forthcoming Great Revolution or Maha Kranti. He described Maha Kranti as involving "earthquakes, floods, accidents, collisions and wars [...]." In the context of these upcoming calamities, he called for courage: "Walk on with courage and bravery. Go on working to improve humankind and establish the Path of Truth. […] Fight for truth! To face life you must have great courage every day". Haidakhan Babaji urged his followers to be "inspired". He stated: "Everything in this world is 'PHURO' – transient. It has no reality. True reality is to proceed on the path of truth, to keep the company of saintly people, and to render service to men."

Babaji advocated on behalf of the less-fortunate. He stated: "you should look to the areas of your countries where people are poverty-stricken and helpless and then do all you can to raise their standard of living, teaching them cleanliness and high morals. To serve the needy truly and from the heart is true service to God. [...]"

Spiritual routine 

Babaji would typically start his day around 3:00 am, with a bath, often in the cold River Ganges, which was followed by meditation or a fire ceremony. Around 5:00 am he would see his devotees for ceremonial chandan (placing a mark on forehead), followed by morning Aarti (devotional singing) around 6:00 am. Then until noon everybody would be engaged in some form of karma yoga. At noon the only meal of the day was being served, followed by more karma yoga in the afternoon. Sometimes a more elaborate ceremony such as the fire ritual havan would be performed around the noon time. In the afternoon, Babaji would sometimes see devotees for individual audiences, known as darshan. Then there would be another bath, followed by the evening Aarti. After the evening Aarti, Babaji gave short speeches that were recorded in "The Teachings of Babaji".

Identity 

Babaji maintained that he was identical with the Hairakhan Baba (also spelled as Hariakhan or Heriakhan) who lived around Hairakhan in the years 1860–1922. He suggested a few times that he was identical with Mahavatar Babaji described in Paramahansa Yogananda's Autobiography of a Yogi. This claim is apparently disputed by the Self-Realization Fellowship, the society founded by Yogananda. Gaura Devi recorded Babaji as saying: "I am no one's Guru, but I am the Guru of gurus."

Guru for Westerners

Babaji was introduced to many Westerners by Leonard Orr, an exponent of immortalism and a founder of the breathwork practice of rebirthing. Orr maintained that Babaji was an immortal; his belief system was shaken by Babaji's death from a heart attack in 1984. His cult is widespread in the Western world, with followings in countries including Austria, Germany, Italy, Sweden, Switzerland, the United Kingdom, and the United States, where the "Yogananda/Babaji Lineage" was established in multiple centres by the time of the first American Hindu census in 2011. 
An ashram dedicated to Babaji, the Haidakhandi Universal Ashram, with a temple to the goddess Lakshmi, was founded in Crestone, Colorado in 1989.
The musician Gopal Hari and his wife Ambika formed a group named Goma, performing Haidakhandi chants on their albums River of Grace and Sacred Source, and a third album of the Haidakhandi Aarati (service of worship).

Haidakhandi Samaj

In India, the Haidakhandi Samaj, with ashrams at Haidakhan village and at Chilliyanaula (Chilianola), provides both communal living and to spread Babaji's message. The Haidakhan ashram, called "Haidakhan Vishwa Mahadham", offers medical and dental services. The Chilliyanaula ashram, called "Anandpuri Ashram", offers free cataract surgery, an ear, nose, and throat clinic, and dental services.

Notes

References

Primary and devotional

Independent

Sources

 
 Babaji Mahavatar. The Descent of Eternity into Time. (1983). Shri Hairakhan Baba Prachar Sangh Foundation. Amsterdam. NL. 
  
  
  
 The Teachings of Babaji. (1983, 1984, 1988). Haidakhan, Uttar Pradesh: Haidakhandi Samaj.

Further reading

 Berry, David. (1986). Have Guru Darshan. VHS and DVD film. DB Productions. 
 Caddy, Renata. (2012). Encounters with Babaji, Master of the Himalayas. Findhorn Press. 
 Churchill, Pola. (1997). Shiva Mahavatar Babaji. Los Angeles: Churchill Publications. 
 Datt, Jai. (2014). Babaji - Only Love - 55 Late Portraits. Kindle edition. 
 Farasiotis, Dionysios. (2011). "The Gurus, the Young Man, and Elder Paisos". St. Herman of Alaska Brotherhood.  
 Giridhari Lal Mishra. (2011). From Age to Age: Stories of Haidakhan Babaji. Powell's Books. 
 Goodman, Shdema Shivani. (1990). Babaji, Meeting with Truth at Haidakhan Vishwa Mahadham.   
 Minett, Gunnel. (1986). Babaji – Shri Haidakhan Wale Baba. Stockholm, Sweden.
 Lal, Arvind. (2018). "Corporate Yogi: My journey as a Spiritual Seeker and an Accidental Entrepreneur". HarperCollins India. 
 Mahendra Baba. (2016). Arti to Babaji Mahavatar: Flames of Divine Love by the Haidakhandi's. Kindle edition. 
 Malhotra, Ashok. (2013). The Babaji Affair. 
 Mckellar, Geri. (2014). How to find your inner glow. A meditation with Babaji. Kindle and paperback editions. 
 Moriarty, Joe. (1984). All Our Teachers. The Melodies of Babaji. Tape recording. 
 Pritam (Piotr Rajski). (2004). Unity Beyond Division. Haidakhan Babaji's Message to the World.  . 
 Pritam (Piotr Rajski). (2020). Truth, Simplicity and Love. Essential Haidakhan Babaji. .
 Ray, Markus; Ray, Sondra. (2016). Babaji: My Miraculous Meeting with a Maha Avatar. .
 Ray, Markus; Ray, Sondra. (2020). The Perfection of Babaji. Kindle edition. 
 Reichel, Gertraud. (1988). Babaji – the Unfathomable. 108 Encounters. Weilersbach, Germany. 
 Romola Butalia Sri Babaji: Immortal Yogi of the Himalayas. Motilal Banarsidass. 
 Taylor, Peter (2004). Shiva's Rainbow. Ethos-UK. 
 Wosien, Maria-Gabriele. (1990). Babaji – Message from the Himalayas. Reichel Verlag.

External links 

 Babaji's UK website: https://www.ukbabaji.com/
 Haidakhan Babaji's Ashram on Google Maps. 
 Haidakhandi Samaj India: http://www.haidakhandisamaj.in/

1984 deaths
Indian Hindu spiritual teachers
People from Nainital district
Year of birth unknown
Indian religions
Kriya yogis